Whirligig was a BBC television programme for children broadcast from November 1950 until 1956. It was the first children's programme to be broadcast live from the BBC's Lime Grove Studios, at 5:00 pm on alternate Saturdays.

Humphrey Lestocq was one of the presenters and the stooge of the obnoxious puppet Mr. Turnip, voiced by Peter Hawkins. Lestocq's catchphrase was "Goody, Goody Gumdrops" and Mr. Turnip's was "Lawky, Lawky, Lum".

The series took the form of individual serials such as "In Search Of The Shadow",  "Stranger From Space" and "The Highwayman's Bargain". None of the 92 episodes are believed to have survived in the form of recordings.

References

1950s British children's television series
1950 British television series debuts
1956 British television series endings
BBC children's television shows
British children's television series
British television shows featuring puppetry